Meloe laevis, the oil beetle, is a species of blister beetle in the family Meloidae. It is found in the Caribbean, Central America, and North America.

References

Further reading

 
 

Meloidae
Articles created by Qbugbot
Beetles described in 1815